Chiasmia normata is a moth in the family Geometridae first described by Francis Walker in 1861. It is found throughout of subtropical Africa and Asia, from India, Japan, Taiwan, Sri Lanka. to the Philippines and in Australia.

Its host plant is Elaeagnus umbellata.

References

Moths described in 1861
Macariini
Lepidoptera of Cameroon
Moths of Madagascar
Lepidoptera of West Africa
Moths of the Comoros
Lepidoptera of Tanzania
Lepidoptera of Zimbabwe
Moths of Sub-Saharan Africa
Moths of Asia
Moths of Australia